Frederick Steiner (February 24, 1923 – June 23, 2011) was an American composer, conductor, orchestrator, film historian and arranger for television, radio and film. Steiner wrote the theme music for The Rocky and Bullwinkle Show and Perry Mason. While Alexander Courage composed the theme music for the original Star Trek TV series (TOS), Steiner's  significant contributions to the franchise included composing more of the incidental music for TOS than any other composer, as well as scoring or conducting the music for 29 of the show's 79 episodes. Steiner also composed and orchestrated additional music for Star Trek: The Motion Picture (1979), was part of the team of composers for the 1985 film, The Color Purple, which received an Oscar nomination, and was an uncredited composer for Return of the Jedi.

Steiner was most active in television series during the 1950s and 1960s. His numerous composition credits included music for Hogan's Heroes, Have Gun – Will Travel, The Twilight Zone, Gunsmoke, and Rawhide.

Early life
Steiner was born on February 24, 1923, in New York City, the son of Hungarian-born film composer George Steiner. Steiner was Jewish. He began playing the piano at age six, and at age 13 had expanded his music studies to include the cello and music theory. Steiner was considered a child prodigy and, from a very early age, had a desire to do the same work his father did - composing film and radio scores. After graduating from Townsend Harris High School he accepted a scholarship to the Oberlin Conservatory of Music where he studied with composer Normand Lockwood. He received his degree in music composition from Oberlin in 1943.

Radio
Straight out of college, Steiner began composing and arranging scores for New York-based radio broadcasts. These early credits included Suspense and CBS Radio Workshop. Steiner also composed for several wartime propaganda shorts made to sell war bonds. The most pivotal point in his early career came when he was introduced to Van Cleave in the early 1940s by his father, who at the time was playing in Cleave's orchestra. When Steiner was later employed as an orchestrator for various later radio broadcasts, he was inexperienced but studied Van Cleave closely to develop his own skills. In 1945 Steiner was appointed the first music director of  This is Your FBI, composing and arranging for 47 episodes of the radio crime drama. With the decline of the radio industry, Steiner decided to shift his attention to television. He moved west to Los Angeles in 1947.

Television
Steiner wrote for a number of television series, including many episodes of the original Star Trek series. An article he wrote for the Library of Congress, "Music for Star Trek: Scoring a Television Show in the Sixties", outlines and defines the contributions of all the original underscore composers of this series.

Perhaps the best-known of Steiner's works, "Park Avenue Beat", is the Perry Mason TV theme. It was used from 1957 to 1966 for the original Perry Mason series and was re-recorded by Dick DeBenedictis for the subsequent made-for-TV movies in 1985. The tune was covered by the Blues Brothers for the soundtrack of the 1998 film Blues Brothers 2000. Steiner said he wrote such a jazzy theme because he envisioned lawyer-sleuth Mason as a flamboyant, film noir type often out on the town, but Mason as portrayed in the series was a somewhat reserved character seen mostly in his office or in court.

Steiner also composed the main theme to The Bullwinkle Show and Follow That Man and contributed music to episodes of Lost in Space, The Twilight Zone, and Amazing Stories.

Feature film work
His feature film work included original scores to films such as Run for the Sun (1956), Time Limit (1957), Man from Del Rio (1956), Della (1964), Hercules and the Princess of Troy (1965), First to Fight (1967), Carter's Army (1970), Heatwave! (1974) and The Sea Gypsies (1978), as well as orchestration/adaptation (sometimes uncredited) for other composers including The Man with the Golden Arm (1956), The Greatest Story Ever Told (1965), and Star Trek: The Motion Picture (1979).

His Academy Award nomination for "Best Music, Original Score" was for The Color Purple (1985). It was a shared nomination with Quincy Jones, Jeremy Lubbock, Rod Temperton, Caiphus Semenya, Andraé Crouch, Chris Boardman, Jorge Calandrelli, Joel Rosenbaum, Jack Hayes, Jerry Hey, and Randy Kerber.

Musicological work
Steiner received a doctorate in musicology from the University of Southern California in 1981. His dissertation was about the early career of film composer Alfred Newman. Prior to Steiner's thesis, there existed little interest in the academic study of film music. Steiner became one of the first to bring musicology and film perspective together. Scholarly articles on film music appear in The Cue Sheet, Film Music Quarterly and the Quarterly Journal of the Library of Congress.

Personal
Fred Steiner died on June 23, 2011, at his home in Ajijic, Jalisco, Mexico, after suffering a stroke at the age of 88. He was survived by his wife of 64 years, Shirley Steiner; two daughters, singer-songwriter Wendy Waldman and Jillian Sandrock of Ajijic, Mexico; his sister, Kay Gellert; two nieces; one nephew; two great-nieces; three great-nephews; two grandchildren; and two great-grandchildren.

Filmography

Radio compositions 
Adventures of Philip Marlowe (1947)
Arkansas Traveler (1946)
The Borden Show (1945)
Candide (1953)
The CBS Radio Workshop (1940s)
Hallmark Playhouse (1940s)
Radio Reader's Digest (1944-1945)

Television
Amazing Stories
Andy Griffith Show (1961-1965)
Beany and Cecil (1962)
The Big Valley (1965)
Bonanza (1971)
Boots and Saddles
Bracken's World
Buick-Electra Playhouse
Cain's Hundred (1960-1962)
The Court of Last Resort
Daniel Boone (1964-1970)
The Danny Thomas Show
Death of a Salesman
Dennis the Menace
The Detectives
Desilu Playhouse
The Dick Powell Show
Dynasty
Ensign O'Toole
Family Flight
Father Knows Best
From Here to Eternity
General Electric Theater
The Ghost & Mrs. Muir
Gilligan's Island (1964)
Gomer Pyle, U.S.M.C.
The Great Adventure
The Guns of Will Sonnett (1967-1969)
Gunsmoke (1961-1979)
Have Gun Will Travel (1961-1963)
Hawaii Five-O (1978-1979)
Hazel
Hec Ramsey
Hogan's Heroes
Honey West
Hotel de Paree
I Spy
Judd for the Defense
Kraft Television Theatre
Lancer

Life with Luigi
The Lloyd Bridges Show
The Lone Ranger
The Loner
The Long, Hot Summer
Lost in Space
The Man from Blackhawk
The Man from U.N.C.L.E
Mannix
The Millionaire
My Favorite Husband
My Friend Irma
Navy Log
O'Hara, U.S. Treasury
Perry Mason
Pete and Gladys
Peyton Place
Playhouse 90
Police Woman
Rawhide
Rescue 8
The Richard Boone Show
Riverboat
The Rocky and Bullwinkle Show (1961)
Saints and Sinners
Star Trek: The Next Generation
Star Trek: The Original Series
The Streets of San Francisco
The Tab Hunter Show
Target: The Corruptors
The Texan
Tightrope 
Tiny Toons Adventures (1990-1992)
Twelve O'Clock High
The Twilight Zone (1960-1963)
The Untouchables (1962)
Valentine's Day (1964)
Wake Me When the War is Over (1969)
Where's Raymond?
The Wild Wild West
Zane Grey Theatre

Movies
Cloak & Dagger
The Color Purple
The Deadly Trackers
First to Fight
Gremlins 2: The New Batch
Herbie Goes Bananas
Man from Del Rio
Night Terror
Run for the Sun
The Sea Gypsies
The St. Valentine's Day Massacre
Time Limit

See also
The Film Music Society

References

External links

Guide to the Fred Steiner papers at the University of Oregon.
 
 Fred Steiner papers, MSS 2193 at the L. Tom Perry Special Collections Library, Harold B. Lee Library, Brigham Young University
 

1923 births
2011 deaths
20th-century American Jews
21st-century American Jews
American expatriates in Mexico
American film score composers
American film historians
American male film score composers
American male non-fiction writers
American people of Hungarian-Jewish descent
American television composers
Historians from New York (state)
Jewish American film score composers
Jewish American television composers
Male television composers
Musicians from New York City
Oberlin College alumni
People from Ajijic